Mercuria may refer to:

 Latin name for Herma
 Mercuria Energy Trading
 Mercuria (gastropod), a genus of gastropods in the family Hydrobiidae